Novoozyornoye is a rural locality (a selo) in Tyagunsky Selsoviet, Kytmanovsky District, Altai Krai, Russia. The population was 184 as of 2013. There are 4 streets.

Geography 
Novoozyornoye is located 13 km east of Kytmanovo (the district's administrative centre) by road. Novoduplinka is the nearest rural locality.

References 

Rural localities in Kytmanovsky District